Henco Bornmann (born 13 August 1982) is a South African former cricketer. He played in one Twenty20 and four List A matches for Boland in 2011 and 2012.

See also
 List of Boland representative cricketers

References

External links
 

1982 births
Living people
South African cricketers
Boland cricketers
People from Oudtshoorn
Cricketers from the Western Cape